Thilanka de Silva (born 19 May 1997) is a Sri Lankan cricketer. He made his first-class debut for Sebastianites Cricket and Athletic Club in Tier B of the 2019–20 Premier League Tournament on 31 January 2020.

References

External links
 

1997 births
Living people
Sri Lankan cricketers
Sebastianites Cricket and Athletic Club cricketers
Place of birth missing (living people)